Pultenaea myrtoides is a species of flowering plant in the family Fabaceae and is endemic to eastern Australia. It is an erect shrub with egg-shaped leaves with the narrower end towards the base, pea-like flowers and  flattened fruit.

Description
Pultenaea myrtoides is an erect shrub with stems that have soft hairs pressed against the surface. The lower surface of the leaves is paler than the upper surface.

Taxonomy
Pultenaea myrtoides was first formally described in 1837 by George Bentham from an unpublished description by Allan Cunningham. Bentham's description was published in his book Commentationes de Leguminosarum Generibus. The specific epithet (myrtoides) means "myrtle-like".

Distribution and habitat
This pultenaea grows in heath and forest on the coast and tablelands of south-east Queensland and north-eastern New South Wales as far south as Port Stephens.

References

Fabales of Australia
Flora of New South Wales
Flora of Queensland
myrtoides
Plants described in 1837
Taxa named by George Bentham